Burciaga is a surname. Notable people with the surname include:

Jessica Burciaga (born 1983), American model
José Antonio Burciaga (1940–1996), Chicano artist, poet, and writer
José Burciaga Jr. (born 1981), Mexican American soccer player
Juan Guerrero Burciaga (1929–1995), United States federal judge